Michael "Mick" Johnson is a fictional character from the British soap opera Brookside, played by Louis Emerick. The character made his first appearance during the episode airing on 12 April 1989. He made his final appearance on 22 August 2001.

Casting
Emerick had been unable to pay off a telephone bill and a woman named Rita offered to pay it. He refused and instead requested that Rita contact his agent should any acting work arise. He credits her for helping him secure the role of Mick. His first day on set was spent with Brian Regan (who played Terry Sullivan). Mick's first scenes involved him picking up a dead body in his taxi with Terry. By 1998, Emerick was on a £70, 000 contract with the show.

Development
In 1992, producers created a new potential love story for Mick and Marianne Dwyer (Jodie Hanson). They spent months falling in love but being unable to act on their feelings. Writers then made the story more complex by creating a relationship between Marianne and Mick's brother, Ellis Johnson (Francis Johnson). Hanson told a reporter from TVTimes that Marianne and Ellis "got caught up in the whirlwind of romance." Their romance progresses fast and they get engaged. Hanson stated that Marianne tries to convince herself that her feelings for Mick is just "sisterly warmth" and that she loves Ellis. The two brothers have very different characteristics which both appeal to Marianne. Hanson described Mick the "solid and responsible" brother and Ellis as the "charming and vivacious" one. She can have a good time with Ellis but ultimately Mick has the "steadfastness she needs in a husband."

Writers continued to play Mick as an integral part of the story. Mick and Marianne's romantic feelings did not wane, despite her protests. On New Year's Eve 1992, Mick and Marianne share a kiss and betray Ellis. They both decide to keep their infidelity a secret and Marianne gets engaged to Ellis. Two months later, writers used the reintroduction of Mick's ex-wife, Josie Johnson (Suzanne Packer) to further complicate the narritve. When Marianne witnesses Mick and Josie together, she is "consumed with jealousy" and proceeds with her wedding in a state of upset.

Emerick told Tina Miles of the Liverpool Echo that he was fortunate to be given "great storylines" such as being stalked and committing an act of euthanasia.

Reception
Jon Horsley from Yahoo! stated "Louis Emerick added wit and humour to the often bleak soap and became one of its most loved and recognisable characters." He named Mick's most memorable storylines as being the victim of racial abuse and a steroid addiction. A reporter from the Manchester Evening News has branded Mick as "loveable" and admitted they missed watching the character. A writer from Hello! believed that Emerick was a Brookside favourite with viewers. Author of Black in the British Frame Stephen Bourne opined that Mick was an inoffensive black character, much like Alan Jackson (Howard Antony), a character from rival soap opera EastEnders. Bourne described them both as "good, reliable, hard-working fathers, and as well-integrated members of their communities."

References 

 

Brookside characters
Fictional Black British people
Fictional taxi drivers
Television characters introduced in 1989
British male characters in television